Kevin Abraham Sabet (born February 20, 1979) is a former three-time White House Office of National Drug Control Policy advisor, having been the only person appointed to that office by both a Republican (Administration of George W. Bush) and Democrat (Obama Administration and Clinton Administration). He is also an assistant professor adjunct at Yale University Medical School, a fellow at Yale's Institution for Social and Policy Studies, and a columnist at Newsweek.

With Patrick J. Kennedy, Sabet co-founded Smart Approaches to Marijuana in Denver in January 2013, which has emerged as the leading opponent of marijuana legalization in the United States. In 2023, he and Kennedy founded the Foundation for Drug Policy Solutions, a think/action tank to tackle the addiction crisis. The US launch took place at the Clinton Foundation's Clinton Global Initiative and the University Club of New York, along with officials from the Clinton, Bush, and Obama administrations. A global launch at the United Nations Commission on Narcotic Drugs will take place in 2024.

Sabet is the author of numerous articles and monographs including the book Reefer Sanity: Seven Great Myths About Marijuana, now in its second edition, and his newest book, Smokescreen, is distributed by Simon & Schuster. He announced on Twitter his new book on all drug policy will be published on Polity (publisher), likely in 2024.

Sabet is the recipient of the Nils Bejerot Award given in conjunction with Queen Silvia of Sweden and was one of four Americans (along with Jonathan Caulkins, Bertha Madras, and Robert DuPont) invited to advise Pope Francis by the Vatican's Pontifical Academy of Sciences to discuss marijuana and other drug policy. He spoke in front of Jeff Bezos, Mark Zuckerberg, Warren Buffett, and others at the Allen and Company Sun Valley Investor's Conference in 2018 and is a regular attendee; he was seen at Sun Valley in one of his first public appearances since 2020 with Zuckerberg and Sheryl Sandberg in 2021.

Upon founding SAM, Salon called Sabet "the quarterback of the new anti-drug movement" and NBC News called him a "prodigy of drug politics".

Education and career
Sabet is a graduate of the University of California, Berkeley and Oxford University, where he received his Doctorate in social policy as a Marshall Scholar. He is an opponent of drug legalization and has spoken on behalf of the Obama Administration on the subject. After leaving ONDCP after 2.5 years, he became a consultant and professor. Rolling Stone called him one of marijuana legalization's biggest enemies.

Sabet is the president of Smart Approaches to Marijuana (SAM). He is a regular contributor to TV and print media and a blogger for the Huffington Post.

Drug policy advocacy
Sabet began his activism as a teenager, campaigning against the abolition of after-school programs sought by the libertarian-leaning Orange County school board. During his freshman year at the University of California, Berkeley, Sabet started Citizens for a Drug-Free Berkeley and worked to educate his peers on the "wave of destruction" that comes with club drugs, including MDMA. He has testified for the US Congress, Canadian Parliament, UK Parliament, and UN bodies multiple times. He has been an invited witness at the U.S. Senate on marijuana issues generally, and cannabidiol.

Sabet has written on the need for prevention, treatment, and enforcement to guide drug policy, although he has also argued for abolishing severe sentencing guidelines, like mandatory minimum laws. His articles have been published in newspapers, such as The Washington Post and The New York Times. He has argued for removing criminal penalties for low-level marijuana use, has opposed legalization while supporting continued civil penalties for use, along with mandated treatment. He supports charges for manufacturing or selling large amounts of cannabis.

Through the work of SAM, Sabet has been an active voice in successful campaigns to stop marijuana legalization initiatives in Ohio (2015), and legislative initiatives in New Jersey, New York, Connecticut, and other states. In New Jersey, Sabet and SAM have partnered with senators, including Senator Ronald Rice, pastors, community organizers, and other public health and safety advocates to resist Governor Phil Murphy's push to commercialize marijuana in the state. This resistance was ultimately unsuccessful after Question 1 was approved by voters in November 2020 and enacted the following February.

In the 2018 legislative sessions, Sabet and SAM were active with coalitions in successful efforts to defeat marijuana legalization and commercialization bills in Illinois, New Hampshire, and Vermont. While Vermont decriminalized marijuana possession in 2013 and allowed for personal use and "home-grow" in 2018, Sabet and SAM have worked with partners to defeat outright commercialization such as seen in Colorado, California, and Washington (Vermont later legalized commercial marijuana sales in October 2020 despite SAM's opposition). In North Dakota, Sabet and SAM allies campaigned against a ballot measure to legalize cannabis that was defeated.

Prior to SAM's founding, Sabet wrote op-eds and spoke across the United States. Some say Sabet is arguably the most influential person in the movement against cannabis legalization in the United States.

Sabet has also organized coalition letters to various administrations regarding the central role of Office of National Drug Control Policy in policy making, and produced a video for Biden transition advisors.

SAM's opposition to marijuana legalization has had mixed success since the 2020 elections, with four marijuana legalization measures being approved in Arizona, Montana, New Jersey, and South Dakota; the following year, Virginia, New Mexico and New York moved forward with legalization via the legislative process. However, legalization did not advance during the regular session in the states of North Dakota, Hawaii, and Maryland.

Smart Approaches to Marijuana also helped support efforts to roll back industry influence in Colorado, tightening current medical and recreational laws.

Books and writings
His latest book, Smokescreen: What the Marijuana Industry Doesn't Want You to Know, was released April 20, 2021. According to its description on Amazon, it contains "interviews with industry insiders who reveal the hidden dangers of a product they had once worshipped" and "tragic stories of those who have suffered and died as a result of marijuana use, and in many cases, as a result of its mischaracterization." Sabet claims that the marijuana industry is putting profits over public health and endangering the American people with dangerously potent products.

His first book, Reefer Sanity: Seven Great Myths About Marijuana, is now in its second edition. Ryan Grim of The Intercept noted, "For backers of legalization, Sabet is dangerous, because he can't be easily dismissed as a reefer-madness-style propagandist. The marijuana reform community should play close attention to his arguments, and the prohibitionists, if they have any plans to reverse the tide, should do the same." Commentator and marijuana legalization opponent David Frum wrote, "Compassionate and knowledgeable, Kevin Sabet is the most important new voice in the American drug policy debate. Policymakers, parents, and concerned citizens should heed his meticulously factual case against marijuana legalization." In contrast, Phillip Smith of Stop the Drug War harshly criticized Sabet's claims and his "willingness to use the coercive power of the state to make us conform to his vision of the public health."

Sabet also co-edited Contemporary Health Issues on Marijuana, published by Oxford, which was highlighted by Jane Brody in The New York Times.

References

External links
 

American psychiatrists
HuffPost writers and columnists
1979 births
Living people
Writers from Fort Wayne, Indiana
People from California
University of Florida faculty
Opposition to cannabis legalization
Cannabis prohibition
Office of National Drug Control Policy officials
Yale University faculty
Alumni of the University of Oxford
University of California, Berkeley alumni
Marshall Scholars